The Trackboyz are an American hip hop production team consisting of Mark "Tarboy" Williams  Joe "Capo" Kent, Travis "Tizzle" Miller,  Marlon "Tracmajor" Byrd,  Rodrick "PubG" Finch & DJ D-Rocc from St. Louis, Missouri. Among the hits they have engineered include Nelly's "Air Force Ones" (number 3 on the Billboard Hot 100), D12's 40 Oz., Nappy Roots "Po' Folks" (number 21) and J-Kwon's "Tipsy" (number 2). The Trackboyz signed with Def Jam Records. The newest project includes the song "Hips" from Adina Howard on her new release for the album Private Show.

Partial production discography

External links
LA Reid Signs Trackboyz To Def Jam
Cool Eh Mag interview

American hip hop record producers
Hip hop duos
Record production duos